Vilain is both a given name and a surname. Notable people with the name include:

Vilain I of Aulnay (died  1269), French knight
Vilain XIIII, Belgian noble family
Eric Vilain (born 1966), French physician-scientist and professor
Luiji Vilain (born 1998), American football player
Rob Vilain, Dutch curler